GroveSite is a privately held online collaboration software company headquartered in Phoenix, Arizona.  The company offers secure online workspaces, sometimes called hosted wikis, to small and medium-sized businesses, and to larger enterprises who need to collaborate securely outside the Ipfirewall.  Their flagship product, GroveSite 5.0, includes document management, web project management, wiki web pages, and other collaboration features. In January 2011, the company released an online relational database product that is also targeted at business users.

GroveSite signed its first two large customers, BearingPoint and Target Corporation, within a year of its 2003 launch.  Most of its clients are in Consumer Packaged Goods, Professional Services, or Government and Non-Profit industries. Notable are OfficeMax, Restoration Hardware, Abt Associates, AARP, ACGME and California’s BTH Agency.  The company and its features are compared to that of other online collaboration, project management and web database solutions, including those from Central Desktop, Basecamp, Trackvia, and QuickBase.  Unlike those companies, GroveSite does some customization of features for particular clients. This makes their product less scalable, but more attractive to those customers.  GroveSite is positioned as an end-user-oriented, customer focused, SharePoint alternative.

History
Grove Technologies LLC, dba GroveSite, was founded in 2002 by three principles, President Thomas I. Selling PhD, CMO Jane Hagen, and CTO Joseph S. McVicker.  Prior to founding GroveSite, Mr. McVicker and Dr. Selling were with Thunderbird, the Graduate School of International Management.  McVicker designed the school’s collaborative professor-student software, a well-liked alternative to Blackboard.  The first GroveSite collaborative workspace offering was launched in January 2003; this is notable for making it a relative pioneer in the software-as-a-service space.  The company has been profitable since 2005.  Since 2006, the company has been women-owned. In 2007, the company was included in Gartner’s Magic Quadrant for Team Collaboration and Social Software; it was also included in the similar 2008 Magic Quadrant study.

Products
GroveSite 5.0 is offered in two plans:  Intro and Pro.  The Intro plan includes a single site and all the general collaboration features.  The Pro plan includes multiple sites, enterprise site and user management, all general collaboration features and the custom online database offering.

GroveSite is a DabbleDB alternative and offers a data migration service to former DabbleDB customers.

Features
Secure Online Workspaces
 Site Creation and Management
 Customizable Branding and Navigation
 Security, SSL Option, Strong Passwords
 Member Enrollment and Management
 Enterprise management: Hierarchies, Usage Reporting, Archiving
General Collaboration and Communication Tools
 Document Management, Check Out/In
 Discussion Forums
 Wiki Web Pages 
 WYSIWYG Editing
 Online Calendars
 Member Directories
 Email Notification, Email Digests
 Image Handling
Web Project Management
 Task Management
 Milestones
 Issue Tracking
 Reports, Gantt charts
 Dashboard
 Task, Calendar Email Alerts
Custom Online Databases
 Flat or Online Relational database
 Custom Database Editor
 Excel Import Wizard
 Custom Views, Filters, Comments
 Quick Edit
 Import/Export

See also
 List of relational database management systems
 List of project management software
 List of collaborative software
 Online office suite
 SaaS
 Collaboration software
 Project management software

References

External links 
 GroveSite
 GroveSite Blog
 Help Desk

Online databases
Project management software
Document management systems
Collaborative software
2002 establishments in Arizona